The Bureau of Immigration (BoI) is an Indian government agency responsible for administering immigration related functions such as immigration facilitation service at airports and foreigner registration. The agency was established in 1971, and is headed by the Commissioner of Immigration. The BoI functions as an autonomous organization under the Ministry of Home Affairs but does not come under any of the Ministry's Departments. The BoI manages 37 of the 86 immigration check posts operating in India. The remaining are controlled by the respective State Governments.

References

Immigrant services organizations
Immigration to India
Immigration services